Licinia Eucharis (1st century BC) was an Ancient Roman stage actress.  She was a star of the Theatre of ancient Rome, and belonged to the few known ancient actresses to achieve fame and respect in her profession during the Roman Republic.

Eucharis was originally a Greek-born slave of Roman Licinia.  In contrast to Greece, where only male actors were allowed, the Romans allowed female performers.  However, many prestigious theatres still barred women actors, and the majority of actresses performed on smaller stages as mimae, pantomime dancer-actresses, which was not regarded as a respectable profession, and therefore often performed by slaves or freedwomen.  Eucharis, however, made a remarkable career.  Her talent on stage eventually resulted in her being freed.  She came to belong to the minority of ancient Roman actresses to be allowed to perform in prestigious theatres and earn a respectable income on acting alone.  She was given speaking parts and performed roles in classic Greek plays in front of audiences of nobles.  She achieved fame and recognition and respect for her acting ability, and it was said that she performed so well as if she was “taught as if by the Muses’ hands.”  She reportedly took pride in her profession and in the respect she earned.

Eucharis belonged to the handful of actresses known from the Roman Republic, including Antiodemis from Cyprus (2nd century BC), Arbuscula, Bacchis, Dionysia, Emphasis, Fabia Arete, Galeria Copiola, Sammula and Lucceia, Tertia, and Volumnia Cytheris.

References 

 Mary R. Lefkowitz, Maureen B. Fant: Women's Life in Greece and Rome: A Source Book in Translation., Johns Hopkins University Press, 2005
 Matthew Dillon, Lynda Garland,  Ancient Rome: A Sourcebook
  Edith Hall, Rosie Wyles,  New Directions in Ancient Pantomime
 Pat Easterling, Edith Hall, Greek and Roman Actors: Aspects of an Ancient Profession
 War, Women and Children in Ancient Rome (Routledge Revivals)

Ancient actresses
1st-century BC Roman women
1st-century BC Romans
Ancient Roman actors
Republican era slaves and freedmen
Ancient Roman theatre practitioners